Yoaz Hendel (born 22 May 1975) is an Israeli politician, journalist, author, publicist and public activist. Dr. Hendel served as Israel's Minister of Communications, as a member of Israel's Security Cabinet and Ministerial Committee for Legislation, a Member of Knesset and as Chairman of his Party (Derekh Eretz). As of January 2023, Hendel is on a break from politics.
He was originally elected as a member of the Blue and White alliance in 2019, before leaving to form Derekh Eretz and serve as its Chairman in March 2020. A military historian by training, Hendel previously worked as a journalist, was the chairman of the Institute for Zionist Strategies (IZS), and taught academic courses at Bar-Ilan University. Between 2011 and 2012 he served as Director of Communications and Public Diplomacy for Prime Minister Benjamin Netanyahu. He was Minister of Communications from May 2020 to December 2020, and from June 2021 to the end of 2022. As Minister of Communications, Hendel led the fiber optics (high speed internet) revolution in Israel. Hendel completed a doctorate in history.

Early life 
Hendel was born to a father of Romanian-Jewish descent and a mother of Romanian and Polish-Jewish descent in Petah Tikva and grew up in the religious settlement of Elkana. At age 18 he joined the Israel Defense Forces, serving in the elite Shayetet 13 naval commando unit as a combat officer, last rank: Major. Hendel was discharged from the IDF after six years of service, and remained active for several additional years in the Israeli security system (last rank Lt-Colonel) and Prime Minister’s Office. During his time in the IDF, Hendel fought in the 2006 Lebanon War and the 2008/09 Gaza War (also known as Operation Cast Lead). He holds the rank of a Lieutenant Colonel in the Reserves where he served served until becoming a member of the Security-Cabinet. During his service in reserve duty, Hendel founded and led a Special Forces unit composed of elite teams from Sayeret Matkal (General Staff Reconnaissance Unit), Shaldag (Israeli Air Force Special Forces) and Shayetet 13 (Naval Commando).

Career

Academia 
Hendel studied history at Tel Aviv University where he achieved his PhD. His thesis was entitled Intelligence techniques in the Ancient World: From the Hasmonean Revolt to the Bar Kochba Revolt. He was a research fellow at the Jaffee Center for Strategic Studies at Tel Aviv University, and then at the Begin-Sadat Center for Strategic Studies at Bar Ilan University. Over the years Hendel published several studies focusing on Israeli intelligence, the Second Lebanon War and guerrilla warfare tactics.

From 2009 to 2013 Hendel lectured on terrorism and guerrilla warfare at Bar-Ilan University's Political Science Department.

Journalism 
Over the years Hendel has written for numerous Israeli outlets. He had a weekly column at Yedioth Ahronoth, Israel's largest daily newspaper and was a military and analyst for the Makor Rishon weekly paper, as well as appearing as a guest columnist in the Maariv daily.

Hendel hosted a number of radio talk shows, including the weekly Retzu'at HaBitachon (Hebrew: רצועת הביטחון, or military strip) corner on Israel's Army Radio (also known as Galei Tzahal), and an afternoon show with his political counterpart, Nitzan Horowitz.

During 2015 Hendel co-hosted the Friday morning talk show on Israel's Channel 10 TV.

Books and writings 
In 2010 Hendel, together with Zaki Shalom, a professor at Ben Gurion University, authored "Let the IDF Win": The Self-Fulfilling Slogan on the Al Aqsa Intifada and the struggle against terrorist organizations. The book won the first prize in the Moldovan Award for Original Military Literature in that year.

In 2011 Hendel published Daddy Goes to Reserve Duty, a children's book about a girl whose father goes often to reserve service in the IDF. Hendel, a constant reserve serviceman, originally wrote the book for his children due to his absence from home while serving in the army.

In March 2012, Israel vs. Iran: War of Shadows, co-authored by Hendel with Jerusalem Post military correspondent Yaakov Katz, was published in Hebrew; the English translation was published a year later. The book evaluates the threat to Israel’s security posed by a nuclear Iran since the Second Lebanon War of 2006, and analyzes Israel’s military and diplomatic options as well as intelligence analysis, future military measures, the Israeli Air Force attack in Syria, Operation Cast Lead, technological advances, cyberspace battles, assassinations and warfare smuggling by sea.

In December 2015 Hendel published his fourth book "In an Unsown Land – an Israeli Journey", providing a first-person account of the tribal code in the Israeli society, and its political and security challenges. The book was described as a right-wing, modern version of Amos Oz’s "In the Land of Israel".

In 2018 he co-authored Conversations on Israeli Hope with former President of Israel Reuven Rivlin, in which he transcribed a series of one-on-one discussions he held with President Rivlin about the challenges facing Israel.

The Institute for Zionist Strategies 
In May 2012 Hendel was appointed head of the Institute for Zionist Strategies (IZS). He remained in this position until his election to the Knesset in April 2019. Hendel also served as an executive member of Hashomer Hachadash, which engages in the protection of agricultural lands, was a member of Beit Hillel Rabbis, Natal (Hebrew: נטל, the national organization for Trauma victims), and the board of governors of Bishvil Hamachar, as well as being active in other organizations.
In December 2017, Hendel led the Jerusalem protests (aligned with the Tel Aviv protests) against corruption.

Public office 
In August 2011 Hendel was appointed Director of Communications and Public Diplomacy for Prime Minister Netanyahu and in early 2012 as a member of the negotiation team with the Palestinians in Jordan. He resigned from his post on 21 February 2012, after Netanyahu told him he had lost confidence in him for having informed the Attorney General Yehuda Weinstein of possible sexual harassment by the Prime Minister's bureau chief Natan Eshel. This information eventually led to an investigation by the Civil Service Commission and Eshel's resignation. Hendel and Cabinet Secretary Zvi Hauser, who was also reprimanded by Netanyahu for the same reason, told Netanyahu that they had not updated him in order to not implicate him in the affair.

In October 2012 the Movement for Quality Government in Israel awarded Hendel the title of "Knight of Quality Government 2012" in the Maintenance of Government Quality and Integrity Category for revealing the scandal. A year later he received the social prize of excellence by Ometz.

Hendel's name was mentioned as a potential candidate during the 2013 and 2015 national elections. He had been in discussions along with Elazar Stern to join different parties: Yesh Atid, HaTnu'a and Am Shalem. Yet he ultimately denied the offers claiming that he “wanted to make a difference from the outside.” 

In January 2019, he joined the Telem party led by former Defense Minister Moshe "Bogie" Ya'alon. In February 2019, Hendel and the Telem party joined the Blue and White slate (along with Yesh Atid and Hosen L'Israel) ahead of Israel's April 2019 parliamentary elections. 
Hendel was placed 9th on the Blue and White slate and entered the Knesset. On October 3rd 2019, Hendel was sworn in as a Member of the 22nd Knesset.
During the 23rd Knesset, amidst the split of the Blue and White slate that began when Benny Gantz was chosen as Speaker of the Knesset, Hendel and his fellow Telem MK Zvi Hauser also voted in favor of Gantz' election to the post. This was done in opposition to fellow Telem and Yesh Atid party members and led to the forming of the Unity Government of Blue and White and the Likud.
In March 2020, Hendel and Zvi Hauser formed their own political faction, Derekh Eretz, with Hendel serving as chairman of the faction.

Minister of Communications 

In May 2020, Hendel was appointed as Minister of Communications in the thirty-fifth government of Israel. 

In June 2020, Hendel announced a reform to solve the issue of fake text messages. This problem was prevalent as various groups were taking advantage of other peoples' cell phone numbers and sending phony messages in their name, while assuming their identity.    

Hendel’s ministry led a major reform, enabling and regulating the spread of advanced fiber optics (high speed internet) throughout Israel. 

Hendel adopted the recommendations of the Rosen Committee regarding the postal services. The committee issued its recommendations in February 2019, yet the two previous Ministers of Communications, Ayoob Kara and Dudi Amsalem, both refrained from implementing them.
In June 2020, Hendel requested that the Director-General of Israel's Government Advertising Agency provide the advertising statistics regarding Facebook, in order to reduce the number of governmental advertisements on Facebook and Google, in light of the global protests against them. 

In November 2020, Hendel visited Rwanda, and met with Rwandan President Paul Kagame. The two signed a bilateral agreement between the two countries regarding the promotion of communications and technological entrepreneurship. During his visit, Hendel also met with the Rwandan Minister of Communications.

On 9 December 2020, Hendel and Zvi Hauser announced that they will join Gideon Sa'ar's new party, New Hope. In December 2020 Hendel was relieved by Benny Gantz from his position as Minister of Communications due to Hendel's joining New Hope.

The following day, Hendel recommended the approval of the HOT company joining ICB’s optical fibers initiative, and he published a hearing for the reduction of Bezeq’s landline rates.

Second Term as Minister of Communications 

Hendel was placed fourth on New Hope's list for the 2021 elections. He retained his seat in the Knesset as New Hope won six seats.

In June 2021, Hendel again became Minister of Communications in the thirty-sixth government of Israel. He resigned his Knesset seat under the Norwegian Law and was replaced by Zvi Hauser.

Just a few days after taking office, Hendel approved the cancellation of the separation between internet supplier and infrastructure. The reform would enable customers to purchase internet service via one single provider and to solve any issues through that provided. Previously, customers would need to purchase internet infrastructure and the services separately.  
In December 2021, Hendel led the decision to lower the rates of telephone landlines by 40%.

In March 2022, Hendel’s postal reform was approved.

In September 2022, Hendel announced that he will not run in the 2022 Israeli legislative election.

As Minister of Communications, Hendel opened up the fiber optics (high speed internet) market and led the communications revolution that brought coverage and stronger connectivity to nearly all of Israel, with an emphasis on connecting Israel's periphery. Hendel led the privatization process of the Israel Postal Company and the major increase of competition in the communications market. By the end of his tenure, Israel emerged as the global leader in terms of the deployment rate of fiber optics (high speed internet) and the pricing for such services.

Hendel now serves as a Director on the board of several private corporations, as the Chairperson and partner in the management of non-profit organizations that assist at-risk youth and encourage higher enlistment in the IDF. Hendel is an author, media professional, publicist and public activist.

Views and opinions 
Hendel is a self-described right-wing, liberal nationalist with a right-wing pragmatic approach. He is generally considered to be on the center-right of Israeli politics.

In March 2013 the IZS, with Hendel as chairman, announced the establishment of a human rights organization called The Blue and White Human Rights Association. Hendel argues in his columns that the real right to the Land of Israel is accompanied by a moral debt. During the establishment conference, it was argued that Zionism is not a monopoly of the right, and human rights are not a monopoly of the left. The organization intends to operate at the crossings checkpoints where the IDF is present, to assist at points of friction, in schools to educate on the importance of purity of arms and with the help of a group of physicians, to provide free medical treatment regardless of religion, race or sex. Unlike other human rights organizations operating in the territories, the policy is not to provide information to the media about human rights violations, but to give the information to the army's authorized investigations. The human rights organization by Hendel deals with public relations on behalf of Israel, and presents the "efforts and the great moral advantage" of the Zionist movement.

At the 2013 Herzliya Conference, Hendel claimed that he supports maximum separation from the Palestinians, but does not see any possibility of fulfilling a peace agreement in this generation. Hendel suggested annexing the settlement bloc and Jordan Valley, giving citizenship to the Arabs living there and, in return, increasing the Palestinian Authority areas from A to B, to create a continuous Palestinian zone and upgrade their political status, calling his proposal "maximizing the Israeli consensus and minimizing the boundaries of dispute". In an interview to Sarah Haetzni-Cohen, Hendel said that there is no "ultimate solution to the dispute", and suggested a quasi-"limited Allon plan".

Personal life
Hendel is married to Shiri, has four children, and lives in Nes Harim.

Published works

Books
 Yoaz Hendel; Zaki Shalom. Let the IDF Win: The Self-Fulfilling Slogan (Yedioth Ahronoth Books, 2010). 
Yoaz Hendel. Daddy goes to reserve service. (Yedioth Books, 2011).
Yaakov Katz; Yoaz Hendel. Israel vs. Iran (Zmora -Bitan Books, April 2011, Potomac Books 2012) Google Books
 Yoaz Hendel. In an Unsown Land: An Israeli Journey (Yedioth Ahronoth Books, 2016). 
 Yoaz Hendel; Reuven Rivlin. Conversations on Israeli Hope (Yedioth Ahronoth Books and Chemed Books, 2018).

Select publications 
 "Iran's nukes and Israel's dilemma". Middle East Quarterly (30 April 2013)
 "Why we lean to the political right in Israel". The Guardian (20 January 2013)
 "Terrorism and Piracy", in Culture and Civilization, (ed) I. L. Horowitz (Transaction Publishers, Rutgers N.J), January 2011
 "Pirates: Not Only in the Caribbean", BESA Center Perspectives Papers, No.106, 14 April 2010.
 "The Lone Terrorist", BESA Center Perspectives Papers, No.86, 13 July 2009.
 "Did Israel's Military Action in Gaza Make Israel More Secure", in: Global Issues – Selections from CQ Researcher, (ed) D. Repetto (London 2009), 77.
 Review of Rose Mary Sheldon's book: Spies of the Bible: Espionage in Israel from the Exodus to the Bar Kokhba Revolt, The Journal of Military History, Volume 72, Number 2, April 2008.
 "The Reserves Comeback", Strategic Assessment, Volume 10, no. 4 (February 2008)
 "Arab Culture in the Eyes of the West", Strategic Assessment, Volume 9, no.4 (March 2007) (with A. Mansour).
 "Conceptual Flaws on the Road to the Second Lebanon War", Strategic Assessment, Volume 10, no. 1 (June 2007) (with Z. Shalom).
 "IDF Special Units: Their Purpose and Operational Concept", Strategic Assessment, Volume 10, No. 2 (August 2007).
 "Failed Tactical Intelligence in the Lebanon War", Strategic Assessment, Volume 9, no. 3 (November 2006)

References

External links 

Yoaz Hendel's articles at the Institute for National Security Studies (INSS)
Yoaz Hendel in Ynetnews
The Future of the Israeli Right: An interview with Yoaz Hendel - Fathom Journal

1975 births
Living people
Blue and White (political alliance) politicians
Israeli historians
Israeli Jews
Israeli people of Polish-Jewish descent
Israeli people of Romanian-Jewish descent
Jewish Israeli politicians
Members of the 21st Knesset (2019)
Members of the 22nd Knesset (2019–2020)
Members of the 23rd Knesset (2020–2021)
Members of the 24th Knesset (2021–2022)
Ministers of Communications of Israel
New Hope (Israel) politicians
People from Petah Tikva
Tel Aviv University alumni